

Current use

Standard gauge 
In Hong Kong, the ex-KCR East Rail line, the Tuen Ma line (combination of the 2 former ex-KCR West Rail and Ma On Shan lines), the Light Rail services, the West Island line, the Kwun Tong line extension and the South Island line use .

Almost-standard gauge 
This gauge is also used on the Bucharest Metro in Romania.

Narrow gauge 

Rail gauge table

Former narrow gauge 

However it was built to standard gauge and was single track, retaining space at places for later expansion. The now-defunct Sha Tau Kok Railway, built in 1911 and closed in 1928, constructed of the same materials used for constructing the main line, was  gauge. The famous Hong Kong Tramways are  gauge. Originally it was to be standard gauge but when the link between the KCR and MTR at Kowloon Tong fell into disuse due to the difference in the choice of voltage for their respective electrification plans, the latter favoured a narrower gauge for technical reasons. This has proven to be an impediment of the proposed merger between the two systems.

The haematite mine at Ma On Shan used an electric internal railway network of 

The Kowloon Godowns in Tsim Sha Tsui, before redevelopment in the 1970s, also had an extensive network of  gauge tracks using tiny hand-pushed  2-axle trucks. Similar systems existed elsewhere in Hong Kong. Railways believed to be metre gauge existed in Taikoo Dockyards and Whampoa Dockyards, though standard gauge is more probable for the latter, since it was connected to the main line network after 1937. A cement works in To Kwa Wan, north of the Whampoa dockyards, used a small internal narrow gauge system with jubilee track (prefabricated panels) and wagons, but apart from a few aerial photographs available at the Lands Department Mapping Office, there is little available information about this system.

During the reclamation of Kowloon Bay for the construction of the Kai Tak estates, "jubilee" track and steam locomotives were used to convey spoil. This area became the Kai Tak Airport which has now been demolished.

See also 
 Bucharest Metro, which also uses  gauge.

References 

Rail infrastructure in Hong Kong
Hong Kong